Emilie Reid (born September 1997/1998) is a British-American actress. She is known for her roles in the ITV series Belgravia (2020) and The Trouble with Maggie Cole (2020).

Early life and education
Reid is from West London. She attended Heathfield School, Ascot. She took a year-long course at the London Academy of Music and Dramatic Art (LAMDA). In 2020, she was awarded a scholarship to train at the Juilliard School.

She is also on the board of directors for the Susan Smith Blackburn Award.

Career
In December 2016, Reid appeared in a production of In the Pink at the Courtyard Theatre in London. After making a guest appearance in an episode of Curfew, she landed her first major television roles in 2020, playing Sophia Trenchard and Roxana Dubiki in the period drama Belgravia and the comedy-drama The Trouble with Maggie Cole respectively, both on ITV, and starring in the lead role of Ophelia March in the Channel 5 mystery thriller The Deceived.

Filmography

Stage

References

External links
 

Living people
1997 births
21st-century English actresses
Actresses from London
English film actresses
English stage actresses
English television actresses
People educated at Heathfield School, Ascot
People from the Royal Borough of Kensington and Chelsea